Alexandre-François Caminade (December 14, 1783 – May 1862) was a French painter.

Caminade was born and died in Paris.  He was a portraitist and a religious painter. He was Jacques-Louis David's pupil.
See also, Larousse article at Cyclopedia of Painters and Paintings, eds. John Denison Champlin and Charles Callahan Perkins

Main works
Flight into Egypt,
Marriage of the Virgin, and
Adoration of the Magi
St. Etienne du Mont, France;

The Levite of Ephraim, and
Entry of the French into Antwerp
Versailles;

St. Theresa Receiving the Last Sacrament
Notre Dame de Lorette

Portraits

 Françoise-Marie de Bourbon, 1834
 Louise Anne de Bourbon'', s. XIX, Mairie de Nozières y Château de Versailles (she was the niece of the above)

Bids
 Album with 64 drawings, 34.5 –28 cm, Piasa, Hôtel Drouot, June 16, 2004, lot 191, not sold
 27 drawings in 2 lots, n° 171–173,  Tajan, November 15, 2004, not sold

1783 births
1862 deaths
Painters from Paris
19th-century French painters
French male painters
Burials at the Cemetery of Saint-Louis, Versailles
19th-century French male artists
18th-century French male artists